William B. Cronyn House, also known as the House at 271 Ninth Street, is a historic home in Park Slope, Brooklyn, New York City. It was built in 1856 and is a three-story Second Empire style dwelling with a slate covered mansard roof. The roof has ornamental iron cresting and a central half-story cupola with clerestory.
In 1888, Charles M. Higgins (1854-1929) acquired the building to use as the Higgins American India Ink factory, and in 1899, added an extension to the factory at 240 Eighth Street.
It was listed on the National Register of Historic Places in 1982.

References

External links
 
 

Houses on the National Register of Historic Places in Brooklyn
Second Empire architecture in New York City
Houses completed in 1856
Park Slope